The third season of The Voice Kids was a Philippine reality singing competition on ABS-CBN. Lea Salonga and Bamboo Mañalac returned to the show as coaches. Sarah Geronimo left the show to focus on her other projects, such as ASAP, and a new album. As a result, Sharon Cuneta replaced her as a coach. Luis Manzano and Robi Domingo returned to host the show; however, Yeng Constantino was replaced by Kim Chiu. Constantino didn't return to the show due to her earlier commitments with some other programs.

The show premiered on May 28, 2016, replacing the fifth season of Pilipinas Got Talent. It airs 7:15 p.m. (PST) every Saturdays; and 7 p.m. (PST) every Sundays.

The show ended on August 28, 2016, with Joshua Oliveros of Team Lea as the champion, the first male grand champion in the show to do so and marking Salonga's first win in the show as coach.

Developments
After the finale of the second season of The Voice Kids, it was announced that the show will have a third season.

Coaches

Lea Salonga confirmed on an interview that she will be returning for the third season of The Voice Kids; Bamboo Mañalac was also confirmed to return to the show. However, it was announced that Sarah Geronimo will no longer serve as a coach on its third season to focus more on her career as an artist. Rumors circulated that Sharon Cuneta will replace Sarah on the show. On May 2, 2016, she confirmed that she is the new The Voice Kids coach.

Hosts
Luis Manzano and Robi Domingo were slated to return as hosts of the show. However, Yeng Constantino was not be able to return to the show due to her earlier commitments with It's Showtime as a judge of the segment Tawag ng Tanghalan and with We Love OPM as a mentor and she was replaced by Kim Chiu.

Auditions

The ages of the auditionees were reduced to 6–13 years old; in the previous season, it was 7–13 years old.

Teams
Color key:

Blind auditions

During the Blind auditions, each coach must now form a team of 24 young artists, instead of the usual 18 during the first and second seasons.

It aired from May 28 to July 16 for 15 episodes with a total of 90 aspiring contestants.

Color key

Episode 1 (May 28)
The first episode was graced by an opening number from the coaches wherein they sang "Heroes" from Alesso.

Episode 2 (May 29)

Episode 3 (June 4)

Episode 4 (June 5)

Episode 5 (June 11)

Episode 6 (June 12)

Episode 7 (June 18)

Episode 8 (June 19)

Episode 9 (June 25)

Episode 10 (June 26)

Episode 11 (July 2)

Episode 12 (July 3)

Episode 13 (July 9)

Episode 14 (July 10)

Episode 15 (July 16)

The Battles
72 artists will advance to the Battles. This part of the competition follows the format of the previous season wherein three artists pit for one of the eight spots per team in the Sing-offs. The Battles aired on July 17, 2016.

Color key

The Sing-offs
24 artists will advance to the Sing-Offs. This part of the competition follows the format of the previous season wherein remaining artists pit for one of the spots per team in the Live Shows. Instead of having two artists per team, three artists per team will be advancing to the Live Shows.

Color key

Live shows

Results summary
Color key
Artist's info

Result details

Live shows details
The Live shows were held in Newport Performing Arts Theater, Resorts World Manila, Newport City, Pasay from August 20 until August 28, 2016.

This season followed the format from the previous seasons wherein the outcome of the Live shows were solely from the results of the public's votes. For the third season, since there were nine artists, there were some adjustments to the voting system over the course of the semifinals.  After the performance of every three artists per coach, the public got to vote on who should advance to the grand finals. Voting was done during the commercial break and closed once the show goes back.

The top three artists (one per team) came from the results of the public votes advanced to the Finals. The public was only allowed to vote once per mobile number per weekend night.

Color key

Week 1: Semifinals (August 20 & 21)
The second night (August 21), the live shows of Coach Lea's 3 finalists, was also graced by a musical number featuring the champions of the past seasons of The Voice Kids, Lyca Gairanod and Elha Nympha, together with the champions of The Voice of the Philippines, Mitoy Yonting and Jason Dy.

Week 2: Finals (August 27 & 28)
Prior to the announcement of the grand winner, Kathryn Bernardo and Daniel Padilla came to the stage and sang Nothing's Gonna Stop Us Now, and promoted their upcoming film, Barcelona: A Love Untold.

After being announced as the grand champion, Joshua Oliveros sang Salamat by Yeng Constantino.

Color key

Notable Artists
 Yessha dela Calzada joined the fourth season of I-Shine Talent Camp on ABS-CBN wherein she was declared as the Performing Arts champion.
 JC Tan joined the fourth season of Star Circle Quest on ABS-CBN during the fifth week, but he is eliminated.
 Justin Alva auditioned during the second season of The Voice Kids, but he failed to make the coaches turn their chairs for him. He later appeared on the first season of Your Face Sounds Familiar Kids and finished in fourth place. He also appeared on Tawag ng Tanghalan: Celebrity Champions and was eliminated to Rhap Salazar in the first round of the Ultimate Resbak Week.
 Noel Comia Jr. later appeared on the second season of Your Face Sounds Familiar Kids and finished in sixth place. He also became one of the hosts of the children's show Team Yey.
Ian Joseph Prelligera and Cyd Ira Pangca later appeared on the next season of The Voice Kids, and both joined FamiLea. Ian was eliminated in the Sing-offs for the second consecutive season, while Cyd finished in third place respectively.
Jean Flores and Misha De Leon later appeared on the second season of Idol Philippines. Jean was eliminated in the Solo Round and Misha finished in tenth place respectively.
 Eleana Gabunada later appeared on the third season of Asia's Got Talent and received a golden buzzer, but she was eliminated in the semifinals.
 Antonetthe Tismo later appeared on the second season of The Clash, as one of the Top 12 contenders and finished in fifth place. She also appeared on the sixth season of Tawag ng Tanghalan, and became a 2-time defending champion but she returned in Quarter 1 Resbakbakan Week, and is currently competing as one of the Ultimate Resbakers.
 Heart Salvador later appeared on Tawag ng Tanghalan Kids and on the second season of The Voice Teens, where she eventually won as one of the grand champions of the season. She became the first comeback artist to become a grand champion of The Voice Teens and the entire Philippine franchise of The Voice.
Carmela Lorzano later appeared and eventually won as the grand champion on the second season of  Sing Galing.

Reception

Television ratings
Television ratings for the third season of The Voice Kids on ABS-CBN were gathered from two major sources, namely from AGB Nielsen and Kantar Media. AGB Nielsen's survey ratings were gathered from Mega Manila households; it is worth noting that since July 2016, AGB Nielsen expanded their coverage to include urban Luzon. On the other hand, Kantar Media's survey ratings were gathered from urban and rural households all over the Philippines.

References

External links
 The Voice Kids (season 3) on ABS-CBN

The Voice of the Philippines
The Voice Kids (Philippine TV series)
2016 Philippine television seasons